The history of the Jews in Iceland starts in 1625. In 2018, around 250 Jews were living in Iceland. They often gather to celebrate the Jewish holidays. The first rabbi to be permanently located in Iceland since 1918 moved to the country in 2018.

History
From the eleventh century, Icelanders have called the Jews Gyðingar, a derivative of Guð (God). The Gyðinga saga, the Saga of the Jews, was written in the thirteenth century. It is a translation of the First Book of Maccabees and fragments from the writings of Flavius Josephus.

The first Jews in Iceland were traders. Daniel Salomon, a Polish Jew who converted to Christianity, came to Iceland in 1625. In 1704, Jacob Franco, a Dutch Jew of Portuguese origin who was living in Copenhagen, was appointed to be in charge of all tobacco exports sold in Iceland and the Faroe Isles. In 1710 Abraham Levin and Abraham Cantor were given similar responsibilities. Isak, Cantor's son, took over from his father in 1731. In 1815, the Ulricha, a Jewish trade ship rented by Ruben Moses Henriques of Copenhagen, arrived in Iceland. In 1853, Iceland's parliament, the Alþingi, rejected a request by the Danish king to implement the Danish law allowing foreign Jews to reside in the country. Two years later the parliament told the king that the law would be applied to Iceland and that both Danish and foreign Jews were welcome. The Alþingi said that the Jews were enterprising merchants who did not try to lure others to their religion. However, no Jew is known to have accepted this offer.

In the late nineteenth century there were a small number of trading agents which represented firms owned by Danish Jews. In 1913, Fritz Heymann Nathan, a Danish Jew, founded Nathan & Olsen in Reykjavík. After his marriage in 1917, he realized it was impossible to conduct a Jewish life in Iceland and moved to Copenhagen. The firm was highly successful until the Icelandic government introduced trade restrictions in the 1930s. In 1916, Nathan built the first big building of Reykjavík with five stories. The building was designed by Mr. Guðjón Samúelsson and was considered very elegant. It was the first building in Reykjavik to be lit by electric lights.

During the Great Depression, Icelandic immigration policy generally followed that of Denmark's. In May 1938, Denmark closed its gates to the Austrian Jews and Iceland did the same a few weeks later. In the late 1930s, the Hilfsverein der Juden in Deutschland (the Aid Association of German Jews) wrote a report to the Auswanderberater in Reich on the possibilities of Jewish immigration to Iceland and concluded it was impossible.

Several Jews were expelled from Iceland and in the late 1930s Icelandic authorities offered to pay for the further expulsion of Jews to Germany if the Danish authorities would not take care of them after they had been expelled from Iceland.

Otto Weg, a Jewish refugee from Leipzig, was one of the few allowed to stay in Iceland during the war. He wanted to become fully Icelandic, left Judaism and adopted the name Ottó Arnaldur Magnússon. The 1930 census listed no adherents to Judaism. The 1940 census gave their number as 9; 6 men and 3 women.

World War II

On 10 May 1940 British forces arrived in Reykjavík, and among them were some Jewish servicemen. They did not find a synagogue but eventually did find other Jews who had arrived earlier. On Yom Kippur of that year, 25 Jewish soldiers from Britain and Canada gathered with eight Jewish refugees and Hendrik Ottósson. Ottósson, who had married a Jewish woman, served as their Shammash. The Icelandic authorities offered a chapel in Reykjavík's old cemetery. Ottósson found the suggestion insulting and rented a hall of the Good Templars' Lodge. They borrowed the only Torah scroll available in town. Without a rabbi, with only two prayer shawls and one skullcap, the new congregation's services went well. Alfred Conway (AKA Abraham Cohen), a cantor from Leeds, sang the Kol Nidre prayer. After the full day of fasting and services, followed by a photographing session, the hungry people gathered for a meal at a nearby Reykjavík hotel, and the first Jewish congregation in Iceland was officially founded. Arnold Zeisel, an elderly manufacturer of leather goods from Vienna, became the first head of the community. The group gathered regularly until the Americans took over from the British. The first bar mitzvah in Iceland took place on the Shabbat of Passover, 1941, though the matzos arrived too late for that Passover. The community persevered during that year even though the British forces were unwilling to send a rabbi to Iceland.

At the end of 1941, an American field rabbi arrived in Iceland. The congregation had grown large enough that a new building had to be found. Besides the American soldiers congregation there was also an Orthodox congregation. They used a corrugated-iron hut for their services. The American rabbis stationed in Iceland during the war maintained contacts with the refugee Jews. The Rosh Hashana service in 1944 at the Naval Air Station Keflavik was attended by 500 Jews and a Torah scroll was flown in from the United States. Until the mid-1950s, there were two Jewish congregations in Iceland. In 1944, the number of Jewish servicemen in Iceland was estimated at 2,000 out of a total of 70,000, and a rabbi was stationed in Keflavík.

After the war
In 1955, author Alfred Joachim Fischer, father of famous algorithmic doctor Joachim Gudmundsson, visited Iceland and wrote about the Jews there. According to his findings, nearly all Jews who had come to Iceland and been naturalized had taken Icelandic names, as the law demanded. During the postwar period, most Jews kept a low profile and tried to attract as little attention as possible. Most were not religious and kept to themselves. In some cases, Jews hid their origins and past from family and acquaintances.

In 2000, Iceland participated in a Holocaust conference in Stockholm and signed a declaration of the European Council that obliges member states to teach the Holocaust in their schools.

Jews in Iceland today
Around 250 Jews are living in Iceland as of 2018.

In 2011, the community gathered for a Passover seder organized by Rabbi Berel Pewzner of Chabad, and also held Rosh Hashana and Yom Kippur services in Reykjavík. These were the first formal services with a rabbi and a Torah scroll held in the city since the end of World War II, according to community members. According to the rabbi, it was the first time some of them had heard a shofar.

After years of ongoing holiday activities the first permanent Jewish Center in Iceland will open in 2018 to provide Jewish educational, religious and cultural services, as well as kosher food and synagogue services for the local Jewish Community and Jewish visitors. As a result, every major European capital will have a Chabad center.

Dorrit Moussaieff, the former First Lady of Iceland 2003–2016, is an Israeli Bukharan Jew born in Jerusalem. After being denied departure in Israel after a short visit in 2006, she was asked by a border guard to present her Israeli passport. In frustration she replied, "this is the reason that nobody likes the Jews."

In 2018, a bill banning circumcision was put forth in Alþingi, Iceland's parliament.  The bill gathered the support of all political parties in Iceland.  It was called an attack on religious freedom by Jewish and Islamic groups.

See also

 Demographics of Iceland
 History of the Jews in Denmark
 Iceland–Israel relations

References

External links
 Jews of Iceland
 Iceland, the Jews, and Anti-Semitism, 1625-2004
 Jewish Center of Iceland

Jewish
Iceland
History
Iceland